Alan Brody is an American playwright and academic, currently Professor of Theater at Massachusetts Institute of Technology.  As a playwright, he has won numerous awards.  He has also directed plays and written two novels, Coming To and Hey Lenny, Hey Jack. From 2000 to 2006 he served as Associate Provost for the Arts at MIT.

External links
Alan Brody's online profile
Professor Alan Brody's interview. Interviewer: Biswadip Mitra
 Alan Brody Playlist Appearance on WMBR's Dinnertime Sampler radio show April 13, 2005
The Alan Brody Papers are held by the Jerome Lawrence and Robert E. Lee Theatre Research Institute, The Ohio State University Libraries.

Year of birth missing (living people)
Living people
MIT School of Humanities, Arts, and Social Sciences faculty
American male novelists
21st-century American novelists
21st-century American dramatists and playwrights
American male dramatists and playwrights
21st-century American male writers
Novelists from Massachusetts